The 2016 Viterra Saskatchewan Scotties Tournament of Hearts, the provincial women's curling championship of Saskatchewan was held January 27 to 31 at the Prince Albert Golf & Curling Club in Prince Albert.  The winning Jolene Campbell team represented Saskatchewan at the 2016 Scotties Tournament of Hearts in Grande Prairie, Alberta.

Teams
The teams are listed as follows:

Round robin standings

Scores

January 27
Draw 1
Dutton 5-3 Selzer  
Inglis 8-2 Martin

Draw 2
Englot 7-4 Barker
Campbell 6-5 Moore
Lawton 9-5 Schneider
Silvernagle 6-5 Anderson

January 28
Draw 3
Campbell 10-2 Inglis
Martin 8-3 Schneider  
Dutton 10-3 Anderson  
Barker 8-3 Selzer

Draw 4
Silvernagle 9-1 Selzer
Lawton 8-4 Inglis
Moore 7-6 Martin
Englot 7-3 Dutton

January 29
Draw 5
Lawton 8-5 Martin
Silvernagle 5-3 Dutton
Englot 6-3 Selzer
Moore 6-4 Inglis

Draw 6
Silvernagle 10-8 Englot
Anderson 7-6 Barker
Lawton 7-3 Moore
Campbell 10-2 Schneider

Draw 7
Anderson 11-10 Selzer
Inglis 5-2 Schneider 
Campbell 8-7 Martin
Barker 10-1 Dutton

January 30
Draw 8
Moore 7-3 Schneider
Anderson 7-2 Englot
Barker 8-7 Silvernagle
Lawton 7-1 Campbell

Tiebreakers

Playoffs

A1 vs B1
Saturday, January 30, 7:30pm

A2 vs B2
Sunday, January 31, 10:00 am

Semifinal
Sunday, January 31, 1:00 pm

Final
Sunday, January 31, 6:00 pm

References

2016 Scotties Tournament of Hearts
Curling in Saskatchewan
2016 in Saskatchewan
Sport in Prince Albert, Saskatchewan